The Office is a 1966 short film by Polish director Krzysztof Kieślowski, produced while he was a student at the Łódź Film School. The film is included as an extra on the Region 1 and 2 releases of Kieślowski's feature film No End.

The film's runtime of 5 minutes consists entirely of interactions at a government office service window, with a clerk handling various requests by people seeking state aid. The film portrays the intense bureaucracy that existed in Polish government services at the time, with the people being turned away for various procedural violations. One request is denied because the applicant brought too many identifying documents, they were told that they needed an official nullification of one of the redundant papers. Another man encounters difficulty because a document was stamped with a square, rather than a round seal.

Chaitanya Tamhane took notations and hints from the film's composition of offices while making Court.

External links 
 

Films directed by Krzysztof Kieślowski
Polish short films
1966 films
Films with screenplays by Krzysztof Kieślowski
1966 short films
1960s Polish-language films